Tawqa Urqu (Quechua tawqa heap, pile, urqu mountain, "heap mountain",  Hispanicized spelling Tauca, Tauja Orjo) is a mountain in the Cusco Region in Peru, about  high. It is situated in the Paruro Province, Ccapi District, south of the Apurímac River.

References 

Mountains of Peru
Mountains of Cusco Region